Mr. Sardonicus is a 1961 horror film produced and directed by William Castle. It tells the story of Sardonicus, a man whose face becomes frozen in a horrifying grin while robbing his father's grave to obtain a winning lottery ticket. Castle cited the film in his memoir as one of his favorites to produce.

Plot
In 1880, in the fictional central European country of Gorslava, prominent London physician Sir Robert Cargrave visits the mysterious Baron Sardonicus at the urgent request of Cargrave's former love, Maude, now the baron's wife. Sir Robert becomes apprehensive when his local inquiries about Sardonicus are met with fear. When Sir Robert arrives at Castle Sardonicus, his fears are quickly justified: he sees Sardonicus' servant Krull (Oskar Homolka) torturing another of the baron's servants with leeches.

Maude is afraid of what might happen if Sir Robert refuses Sardonicus's requests. Even Krull is not immune to the baron's cruelty: he is missing an eye, lost to Sardonicus's anger.

Sardonicus tells his story to Sir Robert. He was born Marek Toleslawski, a farmer like his father Henryk (Vladimir Sokoloff). Marek and his wife Elenka (Erika Peters) lived a humble life with his father, but Elenka and Henryk wanted more. Henryk bought a ticket for the national lottery but died before the drawing; after his burial, Marek and Elenka discovered that the ticket had won but had been buried with Henryk. Elenka insisted that Marek retrieve the ticket from the grave to prove his love to her. Upon opening the grave, Marek was traumatized by the sight of Henryk's "grinning" skull. Marek's face was frozen in a similar horrifying grin, leaving him unable to speak intelligibly. Elenka, terrified by the transformation, committed suicide. The lottery prize allowed Marek to buy a title and a castle, but he had no one to share them with. Marek renamed himself "Sardonicus" and hired speech experts to retrain him to speak. He conducted experiments on young women to find a cure for his condition, but had no success. He learned from his new wife, Maude, that Sir Robert was a great doctor specializing in paralysis, and he had hoped Sir Robert could restore his face.

Sir Robert agrees to try, but he is unsuccessful. Sardonicus demands he try more experimental treatments. When Sir Robert refuses, Sardonicus threatens to mutilate Maude's face to match his own. Sir Robert sends for a deadly South American plant and uses it to experiment on dogs. Sardonicus displays Henryk's open coffin, giving Sir Robert an idea: he will inject Sardonicus with plant extract, then recreate the trauma that caused Sardonicus's condition. The operation is a success, and Sardonicus's face is restored. Sir Robert advises him not to speak until his facial muscles have had time to adjust. The baron writes a note to Maude releasing her from their marriage, and another to Sir Robert asking his fee. Sir Robert refuses any fee, and Sardonicus lets them go.

As they prepare to leave by train, Krull arrives, imploring them to return. Sardonicus has lost the power of speech again, and he cannot open his jaw or lips. Sir Robert tells Krull that the injection was only water, and that the plant extract would have been lethal even in a small dose. It was a placebo, and Sardonicus's affliction was only psychosomatic. Once Sardonicus realizes this, he will be completely restored.

Krull returns to the castle, and upon seeing Sardonicus suffering, puts his hand up to his scarred left eyelid, remembering how Sardonicus had once cruelly plucked that eye out. Now rather than relaying Sir Robert's news from the train station, he instead tells the baron that he just missed Sir Robert's train. Krull sits down to eat his lavish dinner in front of Baron Sardonicus, who continues to suffer, and is doomed to starve.

Cast
Oskar Homolka as Krull (credited as "Oscar Homolka")
Ronald Lewis as Sir Robert Cargrave 
Audrey Dalton as Maude Sardonicus 
Guy Rolfe as Baron Sardonicus 
Vladimir Sokoloff as Henryk Toleslawski 
Erika Peters as Elenka 
Lorna Hanson as Anna

Production

The film was based on a short story called "Sardonicus" that was originally published in Playboy. Castle purchased the rights and hired its author, Ray Russell, to write the screenplay.

To achieve Sardonicus's terrible grin, Rolfe was subjected to five separate facial appliance fittings. He could not physically stand to wear the piece for more than an hour at a time. As a result, the full makeup is only shown in a few scenes, with Rolfe instead wearing a mask over his face for most of the running time.

Castle, with his reputation as the "king of gimmicks" to market his films, built the marketing for the film around the idea of the two possible endings. Near the end of the film, audiences were given the opportunity to participate in the "Punishment Poll". Each movie patron was given a glow-in-the-dark card featuring a hand with the thumb out. At the appropriate time, they voted by holding up the card with either the thumb up or down as to whether Sardonicus would live or die.

The "poll" scene, as presented in the film, is hosted by Castle himself. He is shown pretending to address the audience, jovially egging them on to choose punishment, and "tallying" the poll results with no break in continuity as the "punishment" ending is pronounced the winner. Castle, in his autobiography Step Right Up! I'm Gonna Scare the Pants Off America, claimed the idea for two different endings came from the Columbia Pictures' dissatisfaction with the downbeat ending of the original story and script, so "I would have two endings, Columbia's and mine, and let the audience decide for themselves the fate of Mr. Sardonicus." The alternate "merciful" ending purportedly showed Sardonicus being cured and surviving (although co-star Dalton claims no such ending was ever shot). Given that Turner Classic Movies was unable to locate any cut of the film which included the "merciful" ending, the suggestion of alternative endings itself appears to have been an elaborate conceit on the part of Castle in service of the "gimmick". Castle claimed in his book, "Invariably, the audience's verdict was thumbs down... Contrary to some opinions (just in case the audience voted for mercy) we had the other ending. But it was rarely, if ever, used." The consensus among film historians appears to be that no other endings were ever filmed.

The "punishment" ending occupies only three minutes of film after the "poll", and was the ending of the original Russell short story.

There are reports that a separate version of the "poll" was produced for drive-ins, in which patrons were asked to flash their cars' headlights to vote. A similar variation was filmed for the drive-in market for Castle's The Tingler, but to date no evidence for any variation of Mr. Sardonicus has come to light.

Release

Mr. Sardonicus was released by Columbia on October 18, 1961.

Critical response 

The film received negative reviews from critics.
The PTA Magazine described Mr. Sardonicus as an "elaborately produced [film]... that evokes disgust as well as macabre thrills".The New York Times while praising Lewis's performance, stated that Castle "is not Edgar Allan Poe. Anybody naive enough to attend...will find painful proof".
Allmovie gave the film a mostly positive review, complimenting the film's mounting tension and suspense, and disturbing make-up effects, calling the film one of the director's best works. 
On Rotten Tomatoes the film has an approval rating of 33% based on reviews from 9 critics, with an average rating of 4.6 out of 10.

Cultural impact
The U.S. television series Wiseguy incorporated the film into a story arc about a rich factory owner in Washington state who was fixated on the film and had comparable emotional issues. He was cured by reenacting the film's ending. Noted film critic Jeffrey Lyons played himself, explaining the film's psychological subtext to FBI agents on the case.

Notes

See also
List of American films of 1961

References
Castle, William (1976). Step Right Up! I'm Gonna Scare the Pants Off America: Memoirs of a B-Movie Mogul. New York, Putnam.  (Pharos edition 1992). Includes introduction by John Waters.
Waters, John (1983). Crackpot: The Obsessions of John Waters. New York, Macmillan Publishing Company. Chapter 2, "Whatever Happened to Showmanship?", was originally published in American Film December 1983 in a slightly different form.
Weaver, Tom (2002). Science Fiction Confidential: Interviews with 23 Monster Stars and Filmmakers. McFarland. .

External links

1961 horror films
American historical horror films
American black-and-white films
Columbia Pictures films
Films directed by William Castle
Films based on short fiction
Films set in Europe
Films set in London
Films set in the 1880s
1960s historical horror films
Films set in a fictional country
1960s English-language films
1960s American films